Capri Records  was a rock and roll record label established in Conroe, Texas by Huey P. Meaux and Foy Lee in the early 1960s. It started the careers of many Texas musicians and furthered the careers of Gene Summers, Gaylon Christie, Scotty McKay, and Pat Minter.

Capri was a subsidiary of Crazy Cajun Enterprises, which also owned Tear Drop Records, Shane Records, and Crazy Cajun Records. The label's biggest hit came in 1964 with the release of "Big Blue Diamonds" by Gene Summers and the Tom Toms (Capri 502). Capri  released some of Steve Tyrell's earliest recordings. Teardrop released B.J. Thomas's first hit, "I'm So Lonesome I Could Cry". The recording was later bought and released by Scepter Records. Tyrell was responsible for making that deal as an executive at Scepter.

Discography
 500 – Gaylon Christie and the Downbeats – Tell Me What's on Your Mind
 501 – Ken Lindsey – I Love You a Thousand Ways/Nightly
 502 – Gene Summers – Big Blue Diamonds/You Said You Loved Me
 503 – Billy Holeman – The Other Side of Me/Where Broken Hearts Live
 504 – Gaylon Christie – Wasted Days and Wasted Nights/Tell Me What Is on Your Mind
 505 – Bobby Bennett – Who's Gonna Love You/Go on with Your Dancing
 506 – Ken Lindsey – If You Got the Money/Is You Or Is You Ain't My Baby
 507 – Gene Summers – Alabama Shake/Just Because
 508 – Max Lipscomb (aka Scotty McKay) – Dixie Doodle Dandy/Love Is Magic
 509 – Weird Beard (Russ Knight) – Christmas Singalong/Weird Night Before Christmas
 510 – The Wheels – Yes, I'm Leaving/Meat Balls and Spaghetti
 511 – Tony Monte and the Caravells – They All Ask About Joanie/Martha Is Her Name
 512 – Jimmy James – Sweet, Sweet Honey/Believe Each Word I Say
 513 – Gene Summers – My Yearbook/Jack and Jill's New House
 514 – Johnny Evans – You've Got Class/Huey Meaux On the Shrimp Boat
 515 – The Fallouts – I Cry Alone/Meet Me on the Corner
 516 – Jim Jones and The Chaunteys – Turn on Your Love Light/If You Knew How to Start
 517 – Pat Minter – Go on with Your Dancing/Tears in My Eyes
 518 – Johnny Evans and The Chantels – Do You Love Me So/Dreaming of You
 519 – Billy Holeman – Flip Flop & Fly/Running
 520 – What's Left – Girl Said No/Somebody Took a Shot at Me
 521 – Bobbi & Susie – We'll Take Our Last Walk Tonight/Believe Me
 522 – The Sands – Open Your Eyes/Can't Find A Way
 523 –
 524 –
 525 –
 526 –
 527 –
 528 –
 529 –
 530 –
 531 – Mistics – Memories/Without Love
 532 –
 533 –
 534 – Steve Tyrell – A Boy Without a Girl/Young Boy's Blues
 631 – The Mistics – Memories/Without Love
 C–634 – Steve Tyrell – A Boy Without a Girl/Young Boy's Blues

References

Sources
 Billboard
 Dallas Observer
 "Down in Houston: Bayou City Blues"
 Osborne's Record Guide
 Texas Monthly
 A Guide to the Huey Meaux Papers, 1940–1994
 Texas Music Industry Directory (published by The Texas Music Office) Office of the Governor, Austin, Texas

Record labels established in 1960
American independent record labels
Rhythm and blues record labels
Rock and roll record labels
Conroe, Texas
1960 establishments in the United States
Entertainment companies of the United States